Richard of Ware (died 8 December 1283) was the abbot of Westminster Abbey from 1258 to 1283.

Richard was responsible for arranging the transportation of workers and marble from Rome for the creation of the pavement at Westminster. He also commissioned the creation of a new customary. The customary was compiled by his sub-prior William of Haseley. As abbot, Richard fell into conflict with the Franciscan archbishop of Canterbury, John Peckham, over the rights and jurisdiction of the abbey. He was buried at the abbey in front of the high altar, the inscription (as recorded by John Flete) reading:

Bibliography

References

Year of birth unknown
1283 deaths
Abbots of Westminster
English male writers